Philip Purdue (birth unknown) is an Irish amateur rugby union and rugby league footballer who played in the 1990s, 2000s and 2010s.

Background
Philip Purdue was born in Raheny, Dublin, Ireland, he received a Bachelor of Arts in Computer and Electronic Engineering at Trinity College, Dublin, works as a Software Consultant.

Playing career

International honours
Philip Purdue won 2-caps for Ireland against Wales in 2004 (won 25-12; 17/10/2004) and Scotland in 2005 (won 12-6; 23/10/2005) while at the Clontarf Bulls (sub), and at the East Coast Eagles.

Club career
Philip Purdue played  in the All Ireland League for Dublin University FC and Clontarf FC and played in the 2006 All-Ireland Final with Clontarf. He won the Leinster Senior Cup in 2006 with Clontarf. He played for the Ireland ‘A’ amateur rugby league side 11 times between 2004 and 2008, captaining the side on a number of occasions. He suffered a broken leg whilst playing rugby league in June 2008.

Morgan Treacy of Inpho Photography won the inaugural IRB Rugby Photograph of the Year award for his shot of Clontarf's Philip Purdue during an AIB League match in March 2006. The winning photo, entitled "Mud, Glorious Mud", was taken during the Division One clash between Clontarf and Belfast Harlequins - on a particularly weather-beaten day at Castle Avenue - and depicts back rower Purdue caked in mud and drawing breath following the loss of a lineout.

References

External links
Search for "Purdue" at espn.co.uk
Rugby League Home Four In Final Squad
Scotland Finish Second After Irish Romp
Wolfhounds Defeat England, Clontarf Bulls lose first game
Photograph of Phil Purdue
Photograph of Phil Purdue
Photograph of Phil Purdue
Clontarf 27-18 Greystones
(archived by web.archive.org) How Mud, Sweat and Tears Made Purdue a World-Famous Face
Phil Purdue of Clontarf, celebrating victory over Shannon last weekend, will be hoping to do the same against Garryowen this weekend in the AIB League
Dolphin hunting for place among the elite
J1 League – Old Wesley 10 Clontarf 39
Irish leave Wales A knowing size of the task ahead

Living people
Clontarf FC players
Ireland national rugby league team players
Irish rugby league players
Irish rugby union players
People from Raheny
Rugby league players from County Dublin
Rugby league props
Rugby union number eights
Sportspeople from Dublin (city)
Rugby union players from Dublin (city)
Year of birth missing (living people)